Renato Molinari (born 27 February 1946 in Nesso) is an Italian powerboat racer, and the inaugural winner of the John Player Special F1 Powerboat World Championship in 1981, and won titles again in 1983 and 1984. In addition to this success, Molinari is an 18-time World Champion (in different categories); 11-time European Champion (in different categories), 4-time winner of the Rouen 24 hours, 4-time winner of the Paris 6 hours; twice winner of the Parker Enduro and 3-time winner of the Berlin 6 hours.

Career
Molinari began his boating career in 1964, and won the Formula 1 championship in 1981, 1983 and 1984.

References

External links
 Renato Molinari at CONI

1946 births
Living people
Italian motorboat racers
Formula 1 Powerboat drivers
Sportspeople from Como